This is a list of two-dimensional animation software.

See also

 List of 3D animation software

 
2D animation